Ritiševo is a village in Serbia. It is situated in the Vršac municipality, in the South Banat District, Vojvodina province. The village has a Romanian ethnic majority (72.10%) and its population numbering 496 people (2011 census).

See also
List of populated places in Serbia
List of cities, towns and villages in Vojvodina

Populated places in Serbian Banat
Populated places in South Banat District
Vršac
Romanian communities in Serbia